Brendon Lindsay (born 21 September 1977) is a former Scotland international rugby league footballer who played as a stand-off.

Background
Lindsay was born in Australia.

Career
He played for the Gold Coast Vikings in the 1998 Queensland Cup.

He later played in 90 games for the Ipswich Jets in the Queensland Cup. He scored 33 tries and a total of 224 points.

He signed for Sheffield Eagles in 2006 and played for 5 seasons, combining his role as a player with community work and as part of the club administration staff.

References

External links
(archived by web.archive.org) Sheffield Eagles profile

1977 births
Australian people of Scottish descent
Australian rugby league players
Sheffield Eagles players
Living people
Gold Coast Vikings players
Ipswich Jets players
Scotland national rugby league team players
Rugby league halfbacks
Gold Coast Chargers players
Place of birth missing (living people)